Qadimi castle is a historical castle located in Bijar County in Kurdistan Province, The longevity of this fortress dates back to the Qajar dynasty and Pahlavi dynasty.

References 

Castles in Iran
Qajar castles